Binary acids or Hydracids are certain molecular compounds in which hydrogen is combined with a second nonmetallic element.  

Examples: 
HF
H2S
HCl 
HBr 
HI
HAt

Their strengths depend on the solvation of the initial acid, the H-X bond energy, the electron affinity energy of X, and the solvation energy of X.  Observed trends in acidity correlate with bond energies, the weaker the H-X bond, the stronger the acid.  For example, there is a weak bond between hydrogen and iodine in hydroiodic acid, making it a very strong acid.

Binary acids are one of two classes of acids, the second being the oxyacids, which consist of a hydrogen, oxygen, and some other element.

The names of binary acids begin with hydro- followed by the name of the other element modified to end with -ic. 

Some texts contrast two types of acids.  1. binary acids  or hydracids and 2. oxyacids that contain oxygen.

See also
 Acid
 Oxyacid

References
Hill; Petrucci; McCreary; Perry. General Chemistry, Fourth Edition. New Jersey, Pearson Prentice Hall. 2005

Acids